Buhera District is a district in Manicaland Province, Zimbabwe.

Geography
The district is located in Manicaland Province, in southeastern Zimbabwe. It is bordered by Chikomba District and Wedza District to the north, both in Mashonaland East Province. To the northeast lies Makoni District and Mutare District lies to the east. Chimanimani District and Chipinge District lie to the southeast. Gutu District in Masvingo Province lies to the south and west of Buhera District. Key towns include Buhera (district capital), Murambinda, Nyashanu and Dorowa.

The Save River forms the eastern and northeastern boundary of the district with Chipinge, Chimanimani, and Mutasa districts. The Devuli River, a tributary of the Save, forms the southeastern boundary.

Overview

Buhera District is a rural district. The local economy depends mainly on farming. The main crops are: maize, millet (mhunga), roundnuts (nyimo) and groundnuts (nzungu). Cattle ranching is also practiced in the district. Although the rains are not very reliable, the area is fertile with several irrigation schemes for the populace to supplement their meager harvests. However the schemes are now in sorry state due to government neglect. The ranching and wildlife make life enjoyable and fruitful. The largest employer in the district is Dorowa Minerals, a phosphate mine, which employs about 300 people.

The highest mountain in Buhera is Maremare near Mutiusinazita in Buhera South.

Administration
The district is divided into 33 administrative wards.

Buhera is divided into four National Assembly parliamentary constituencies: Buhera Central, Buhera North, Buhera South, and Buhera West. The district is a single Senate constituency.

History
The name Buhera is a Nguninised, then Anglicised version of the name uHera.  uHera means territory of the Hera and is reference to the fact that the Hera ethnic group of the Shona lived in the area and in neighbouring Chikomba District. The vaHera  of the Museyamwa totem occupy most of the Buhera territory (under Chief Nyashanu) and much of neighbouring Chikomba (under chief Mutekedza).

The Va Hera are of the Shona tribe and claim that they came from Guruuswa, which has been identified as an area north of the Zambezi River, perhaps around Uganda or South Sudan. Chiurwi Mountain was a major staging point for ZANLA liberation forces, during the Second Chimurenga War (1966 - 1979).

Population

During the 2012 district census, the population of the district was estimated at 245,878. The majority of the district residents are subsistence farmers, through a communal land system administered by the local chiefs. There are two designated urban areas in the district,  namely; Murambinda and Birchenough Bridge.

Education
The district has a total of 140 primary schools and 55 secondary schools in 2004. Some of the notable schools in the area include: Nyashanu High School and Makumbe High School, both named after chiefs.

Notable people
The notable people associated with the district include the following:

 Morgan Tsvangirai – The former prime minister of Zimbabwe, MDC Leader has roots in Buhera District.
Joseph Chinotimba – current ZANU–PF Member of Parliament for Buhera
 Gideon Gono – Governor of the Reserve Bank of Zimbabwe is a native of Buhera District.
 Paul Madzore – The member of parliament for Glen Norah, on the MDC-T ticket, comes from Usavi Village, in Buhera district
 Kumbirai Kangai – A politician of the Zanu-PF political party is a native of Buhera District
 Morgan Tsvangirai's aide Tichaona Chiminya and his companion Talent Mabika were killed when their car was petrol bombed in Buhera District.
Solomon Madzore, younger brother to Paul Madzore and also member of parliament for Dzivarasekwa and former MDC-T youth leader comes from Usavi village in Buhera.
George Charamba, President Mugabe's spokesperson and Permanent Secretary of Media and Information is also from Buhera.
The former Governor of Manicaland province Kenneth Manyonda also hails from Buhera.
The late political activist and University Professor John Makumbe hailed from Marenga in Buhera.
Eric Taurai Matinenga: lawyer and member of parliament for Buhera West, hails from Murambinda, Buhera

See also
 Districts of Zimbabwe
 Provinces of Zimbabwe
 Geography of Zimbabwe
 Economy of Zimbabwe
 Murambinda
 Birchenough Bridge

References

External links
 Buhera District - One of The Poorest In Zimbabwe

 
Districts of Manicaland Province